Yuliya Anatoliyivna Krol (born 22 October 1998) is a Ukrainian cross country skier who has competed internationally since 2016.

Career
Krol started her international career in 2016 when she participated at the 2016 Winter Youth Olympics in Norwegian Lillehammer. She finished 27th in 5 km freestyle race, 15th in sprint, and 28th in cross freestyle. She also took part in three FIS Nordic Junior World Ski Championships between 2016 and 2018 (with her best personal result being 30th in 5 km classical race in Swiss Goms in 2018) as well as two U23 World Ski Championships in 2019 and 2020 (with her best personal result being 34th in sprint in Finnish Lahti in 2019).

She debuted at World Cup on February 18, 2017, in Estonian Otepää where she finished 65th in freestyle sprint. As of January 2022, Krol's best World Cup individual finish was 43rd in a freestyle sprint event in Dresden, Germany, on December 19, 2020, and best World Cup team finish was 24th in team sprint in Dresden, Germany, on January 12, 2020 (together with Kaminska).

In 2022, Yuliia Krol was nominated for her first Winter Games in Beijing.

She participated in three FIS Nordic World Ski Championships. Her best finish was 15th in team sprint in 2017 (together with Antypenko) while her best individual finish was 47th in the 30 km event in 2021.

Cross-country skiing results
All results are sourced from the International Ski Federation (FIS).

Olympic Games

World Championships

World Cup

Season standings

Personal life
She studied physical culture and sport at the Sumy State University.

References

External links
 
 
 
 

1998 births
Living people
Ukrainian female cross-country skiers
Cross-country skiers at the 2016 Winter Youth Olympics
Cross-country skiers at the 2022 Winter Olympics
Olympic cross-country skiers of Ukraine
Sumy State University alumni
Sportspeople from Sumy Oblast